The London Senior Football Championship is a Gaelic Athletic Association cup competition between the top Gaelic football clubs in London, England. The London Football championship began in 1897 with Ireland United winning the first title. Tir Chonaill Gaels have won the competition the most times (18).

The 2022 Champions are St Kiernan's who beat Fulham 0-13 to 0-8 in a replay on Saturday 30 October 2022 at McGovern Park in Ruislip to retain their championship.

Wins listed by club

Finals listed by year

 The 2020 Championship was not completed until 2021 due to the impact of the COVID-19 pandemic on Gaelic games

References

 
Senior Gaelic football county championships